Hibiscus phoeniceus is a species of Hibiscus found from Central to South America.

References

External links
 
 

phoeniceus
Plants described in 1776